Kaltura is a New York-based software company founded in 2006. Kaltura operates in four major markets: Cloud TV for operators and media companies, online video platform (OVP) offered mostly to media companies and brands looking to distribute content or monetize it, Education Video Platform (EdVP) offered to educational institutions, and Enterprise Video Platform (EVP) for collaboration, communications and marketing.

History

Kaltura was founded in the fall of 2006 and was launched at the TechCrunch40 industry event in San Francisco on September 18, 2007, and won the People's Choice award based on a vote of the conference's attendees. At that time, the company had 20 employees, and had received $2.1 million in funding from business angels and Californian VC fund Avalon Ventures.

On December 21, 2007, Kaltura won the People's Choice award (over 250,000 users participated in voting) in the Video Sharing category for the Mashable Open Web Awards. Also in 2007, Kaltura began a partnership with the New York Public Library, whose team was headed by Joshua Greenberg. In 2008, Kaltura was selected as one of the "Global 250 Winners" by AlwaysOn. Kaltura CEO and cofounder Ron Yekutiel was photographed for the article "The Suit, Vers. 3.0" in Esquire'''s July 2008 edition.

In January 2008, the Wikimedia Foundation and Kaltura announced that they had begun a collaboration aimed at bringing rich-media collaboration to Wikipedia and other wiki websites. The technology behind this project is a form of video-wiki software (of open source purport) that was integrated into the MediaWiki platform as an extension, allowing users to add collaborative video players that enable all users to add and edit images, sounds, diagrams, animations and movies in the same manner as they do today with text.

Kaltura was a sponsor of the Wikimania 2008 event, where it announced that it is sponsoring Michael Dale, an open source video developer, to support the further development of a 100% open source video editing solution integrated into MediaWiki. Kaltura is also a founder of the Open Video Alliance, a group of organizations, academics, artists and entrepreneurs, geared towards promoting open standards for video on the web.

In July 2011, Kaltura Blackboard Inc. and Kaltura announced a partnership to integrate Kaltura's media solution in Blackboard Learn (TM).

In May 2014 Kaltura purchased Tvinci for its over-the-top (OTT) TV service. In August 2016, Kaltura announced that it had raised $50 million from Goldman Sachs. Also in 2016, Kaltura partnered with Inception, 24i Media, Encompass and Harmonic to showcase OTT experiences. In 2017 a collaboration with a cloud based Unified Communications solution nominated from Gartner Inc. as Cool Vendor in Unified Communications, 2017''
was announced. In December 2017, Kaltura had 450 employees. In 2019 Kaltura crossed $100 million in annual recurring revenues (ARR).

In 2015, Kaltura had been supposedly planning an IPO, which by September 2020 had not happened. Co-founder Shay David, openly stated in 2017, that Kaltura had turned down a $500 million offer to acquire the company and that an IPO would only be possible when the financial data support an IPO at a valuation of close to $1 billion.

In April 2019 Kaltura announced its intention to develop Cloud TV with Dativa through a dedicated data lake.

In early 2020 Kaltura announced its acquisition of Newrow, a platform for collaborative online meetings. In which they provide an internal portal for managing video content to over 600 educational institutions including Harvard, Princeton, and Stanford. Allowing them to reach more than six million students in North America.

Corporate affairs 
Kaltura currently has offices in Brazil, Israel, Singapore, the United Kingdom, and the United States.

Leadership 
Kaltura is managed by chairman, CEO and Co-founder Ron Yekutiel. Other key executives are:

 Shay David, President, General Manager, Media & Telecom and Co-founder
Nuno Sanches, General Manager, Media and Telecom
Michal Tsur, President, General Manager, Enterprise & Learning and Co-founder
 Sergei Liakhovetsky, Chief Technology Officer
 Yaron Garmazi, Chief Financial Officer
 Sigal Srur, Chief Human Resources Officer
 Ido Wiesenberg, Senior Vice President, Corporate Development
 Yehiam Shinder, Chief Information Officer

Products / business model 
Kaltura's original concept was built on the collaborative Wiki model that uses media rather than text. Over time, the company changed its focus to providing a broad video platform as a service, as well as many turnkey SaaS products.

Kaltura's products today include a Video Platform as a Service (VPaaS), an OTT TV (cloud TV) Platform, a video player, a mobile video player SDK, a Webcasting platform, a Lecture Capture offering, a Video Management Platform, a Video Portal (CorporateTube) product, a WordPress plugin, a Drupal video module, a Blackboard Video Building Block, a Moodle Video Extension, a SharePoint Video Webpart, a Canvas Extension, a Brightspace Video Extension, a Sakai Extension, and Ruby and PHP, and .NET frameworks.

Kaltura systems have been deployed in the UK Parliament`s online audio-video streams.

Kaltura is also working on privacy, search and virtual lounges for one-to-one networking.

Awards 

 2007: People's Choice award in the Video Sharing category for the Mashable Open Web Awards 
 2008: "Global 250 Winners" by AlwaysOn

In 2018, Inc. named Kaltura as one of "20 Tech Innovators to Watch".

In 2020, Kaltura was added to TechCrunch's "$100 million ARR club", a list of companies that exceed $100 million in annual recurring revenue (ARR).

References

Companies listed on the Nasdaq
Software companies based in New York (state)
American photography websites
Social networking services
Image-sharing websites
Video on demand services
Video hosting
Software companies of the United States
Software companies established in 2006
2021 initial public offerings